Andria Balanchivadze (Andria Melit'onis dze Balanchivadze, Andrei Melitonovich Balanchivadze) ( – 28 April 1992) was a Georgian composer. He was the son of composer Meliton Balanchivadze and brother of ballet choreographer George Balanchine.

Biography 
Born in Saint Petersburg, Russian Empire, he graduated from the Tbilisi State Conservatoire in 1927 and Leningrad Conservatory in 1931, where he studied with Pyotr Ryazanov. Upon his return to Georgia, he became the musical director of several theatres from 1931 to 1934.

Having barely survived Joseph Stalin's purges, he became a professor at the Tbilisi Conservatory in 1942 and served as an artistic director of the Georgian State Symphony from 1941 to 1948. He became a major influence in musical politics as chair (1953), and first secretary (1955–1961, 1968–1972) of the Union of Georgian Composers. Balanchivadze’s numerous symphonies, pianoforte concertos, and compositions for the stage heavily contributed to modern Georgian classical music. He also authored the first Georgian ballet, The Heart of the Mountains (1936). 

He was granted the titles of the People's Artist of Georgia (1957) and of the Soviet Union (1968) and awarded with several prizes, including the Stalin Prize in 1944 and the Shota Rustaveli State Prize in 1969.

References

1906 births
1992 deaths
20th-century composers
Composers from Georgia (country)
Musicians from Tbilisi
Saint Petersburg Conservatory alumni
Tbilisi State Conservatoire alumni
Eighth convocation members of the Supreme Soviet of the Soviet Union
Heroes of Socialist Labour
People's Artists of the USSR
Stalin Prize winners
Recipients of the Order of Friendship of Peoples
Recipients of the Order of Lenin
Recipients of the Order of the Red Banner of Labour
Rustaveli Prize winners
Ballet composers
Burials at Didube Pantheon